Cylance Pro Cycling was an American UCI Continental cycling team established in 2014.

The team disbanded at the end of the 2017 season.

Team roster

Major results
2014
1st  National Road Race Championships, Efren Ortega

References

UCI Continental Teams (America)
Cycling teams established in 2014
Cycling teams based in Puerto Rico
2014 establishments in Puerto Rico